Chaitra is a month of the Hindu calendar.

In the standard Hindu calendar and India's national civil calendar, Chaitra is the first month of the year. It is the last month in the Bengali calendar, where it is called Choitro. Chaitra or Chait is also the last month in the Nepali calendar (the Vikram Samvat), where it commences in mid-March. Chittirai is the first month in the Tamil calendar. In the Sindhi calendar, this month is referred to as Chet and is marked by the celebration of the Cheti Chand (birth of Jhulelal, an incarnation of Vishnu). In the Vaishnava calendar, Vishnu governs this month. In solar religious calendars Chaitra Begins with the Sun's Entry Into Pisces.

In the more traditional reckoning, the first month commences in March or April of the Gregorian calendar, depending upon whether the adhika masa (extra month for alignment of lunar or solar calendar) was observed in the year. The first day of Chaitra is marked as the Hindu New Year.

Names 
Hindi and Marathi: चैत्र chaitra, Gujarati: ચૈત્ર chaitra, Nepali: चैत chait, Rajasthani: चेत chet, Punjabi: ਚੇਤ cēt, Sindhi:  चेट chet, Bengali: চৈত্র Choitro, Assamese: চ’ত sot, Odia: ଚୈତ୍ର Chaitra, Kannada: ಚೈತ್ರ Chaitra, Telugu: చైత్రము chaitramu, Tamil: சித்திரை chittirai, Malayalam: ചൈത്രം chaitram.

Festivals
The month of Chaitra is also associated with the departure of spring. Holi, the Hindu spring festival of colours, is celebrated on the full moon day (Purnima) of Phalguna, the month before Chaitra, exactly six days after which the festival of Chaiti is observed.

In Chandramana (lunar) religious calendars, Chaitra begins with the new moon in March/April and is the first month of the year. The nine-day festival Chaitra Navaratri or Nava Durga (nine forms of the Goddess Durga) starts from Chaitra Shukla Pratipada. The first day of month Chaitra is celebrated as Hindu New Year's Day, known as Gudi Padwa in Maharashtra,  Puthandu in Tamil Nadu and Ugadi in Karnataka, Telangana, and Andhra Pradesh. In West Bengal, Basanti Puja, Annapurna Puja, Ram Nabami, Neel Puja and Chorok Puja aka 'Gajon' are held consecutively before the beginning of Bengali New Year on Poila Baishakh.

See also

 Astronomical basis of the Hindu calendar
Chaiti
 Hindu units of measurement
 Hindu astronomy
 Jyotisha
 Chitragupta
 Nisan

References

External links
 Chaitra Navratri 

01